In finance, an exchange of futures for physicals (EFP) is a transaction between two parties in which a futures contract on a commodity is exchanged for the actual physical good.  This transaction involves a privately negotiated exchange of a futures position for a corresponding position in the underlying physical.  An EFP is similar to an EFS, except that it involves a physical contract rather than a cash swap contract.  An EFP gives the market participants the ability to manage risk.

References

Futures markets
Derivatives (finance)